The R627 is a regional road between Midleton in County Cork and Tallow, County Waterford in Ireland. Most of the route is in County Cork.

See also
Roads in Ireland

References
Roads Act 1993 (Classification of Regional Roads) Order 2006 – Department of Transport

Regional roads in the Republic of Ireland
Roads in County Cork
Roads in County Waterford